The Estadio Victor Della Valle is a football stadium in Montevideo, Uruguay with a capacity of 6,000. It is the home stadium of El Tanque Sisley, a team in the Uruguayan Primera División.

References

Carrasco, Montevideo
Victor Della Valle